The Oak Hill School House is a historic school building at 151 Little Oak Hill Road in rural Searcy County, Arkansas,  southwest of Marshall, Arkansas.  It is a single-story stone structure, with a stone foundation, and a gabled roof made of corrugated metal. A gabled porch shelters the main entrance at the center of the north facade, supported by square posts.  The school was built about 1934 on the site of a wood-frame school built in 1910, and served the area community until the mid-1950s.  It continues to serve the area community as a gathering place for social events and religious services.

The building was listed on the National Register of Historic Places in 2019.

See also
National Register of Historic Places listings in Searcy County, Arkansas

References

School buildings on the National Register of Historic Places in Arkansas
Buildings and structures in Searcy County, Arkansas
National Register of Historic Places in Searcy County, Arkansas